Pardaliscidae is a family of amphipods, whose members typically inhabit the deepest parts of ocean basins. It contains the following genera:

Andeepia Biswas, Coleman & Hendrycks, 2009
Antronicippe Stock & Illife, 1990
Arculfia Barnard, 1961
Caleidoscopsis G. Karaman, 1974
Epereopus Mills, 1967
Halice Boeck, 1871
Halicella Schellenberg, 1926
Halicoides Walker, 1896
Macroarthrus Hendrycks & Conlan, 2003
Necochea Barnard, 1962
Nicippe Bruzellius, 1859
Octomana Hendrycks & Conlan, 2003
Parahalice Birstein & M. Vinogradov, 1962
Pardalisca Krøyer, 1842
Pardaliscella Sars, 1893
Pardaliscoides Stebbing, 1888
Pardaliscopsis Chevreux, 1911
Parpano J. L. Barnard, 1964
Princaxelia Dahl, 1959
Rhynohalicella G. Karaman, 1974
Spelaeonicippe Stock & Vermeulen, 1982
Tosilus J. L. Barnard, 1966

Pardisynopia Barnard, 1961 is a synonym of Halicoides Walker, 1896.

See also

Princaxelia jamiesoni

References

Gammaridea
Crustacean families